Royden Ingham (April 29, 1911 – May 7, 1999) was an American cyclist. He competed in the tandem event at the 1932 Summer Olympics.

References

External links
 

1911 births
1999 deaths
American male cyclists
Olympic cyclists of the United States
Cyclists at the 1932 Summer Olympics
Cyclists from Los Angeles